Aymen Abdennour (born 6 August 1989) is a Tunisian professional footballer who plays as a centre-back for  club Rodez.

A full international with over 53 caps since 2009, he represented Tunisia at three Africa Cup of Nations tournaments.

Club career

Early career
Abdennour was born in Sousse, Tunisia, and started his career at Étoile Sportive du Sahel in 2008. During his spell there, he became the favourite player by fans despite being one of the youngest players in the team. In the 2008–09 season he scored five goals for his club, but they missed on the title and finished third.

On 14 January 2010, Abdennour signed a half-year loan deal with Werder Bremen which initially saw him stay at the club until the end of the 2009–10 season. Bremen had the contract option to sign him permanently. Abdennour made six appearances for Werder Bremen, but they did not take up the option to sign him and he returned to Étoile.

Toulouse
In July 2011, Abdennour signed a four-year contract with the Ligue 1 side Toulouse. In February 2012, Toulouse extended this, tying the Tunisian to a deal running until 2016.

Monaco
On 31 January 2014, Abdennour joined the league rivals Monaco on a loan deal. After impressing during a loan spell, he signed a four-year deal with Monaco on 4 July 2014. The 2014–15 season was a successful season for Abdennour and his team, with a third place in Ligue 1 and an elimination against Champions League finalist Juventus in the quarter final.

Valencia
In August 2015, after a good season with Monaco, Abdennour signed a five-year deal until 2020 with La Liga side Valencia CF for an undisclosed fee, mainly as a replacement to Manchester City-bound Nicolás Otamendi.

Loan to Marseille
On 29 August 2017, Abdennour returned to France to play for Marseille, on a two-year loan deal.

Kayserispor
On 11 July 2019, it was announced that following Abdennour's release from Valencia, that he would immediately join Turkish Süper Lig club Kayserispor.

Umm Salal
On 16 September 2020, Abdennour moved to Qatar to play for Umm Salal.

Rodez 
On 30 August 2022, Abdennour signed for Ligue 2 club Rodez on a season-long contract.

International career
His excellent domestic performances earned him a call-up to the Tunisia squad, and, has won 53 caps for his country, scoring one goal.

He was also the captain of the under-21 team.

Career statistics

International

Honours
Individual
 CAF Team of the Year: 2016

References

External links 

 
 
 
 
 

1989 births
Living people
People from Sousse
Association football defenders
Tunisian footballers
Tunisia international footballers
2011 African Nations Championship players
2012 Africa Cup of Nations players
2013 Africa Cup of Nations players
2015 Africa Cup of Nations players
2017 Africa Cup of Nations players
Étoile Sportive du Sahel players
SV Werder Bremen players
Toulouse FC players
AS Monaco FC players
Valencia CF players
Olympique de Marseille players
Kayserispor footballers
Umm Salal SC players
Rodez AF players
Bundesliga players
Ligue 1 players
La Liga players
Süper Lig players
Qatar Stars League players

Tunisian expatriate footballers
Expatriate footballers in Germany
Expatriate footballers in France
Expatriate footballers in Spain
Expatriate footballers in Turkey
Expatriate footballers in Qatar
Tunisian expatriate sportspeople in Germany
Tunisian expatriate sportspeople in France
Tunisian expatriate sportspeople in Spain
Tunisian expatriate sportspeople in Turkey
Tunisian expatriate sportspeople in Qatar
Tunisia A' international footballers